Phantasie is the first video game in the Phantasie series.

Gameplay

Based on the Isle of Gelnor, Phantasie allows a group of six characters to adventure the countryside and try to defeat the evil Black Knights and their sorcerer leader, Nikademus. Players could choose to be one of six character classes (Thief, Fighter, Ranger, Monk, Priest, and Wizard) and could also choose between the races of Human, Dwarf, Halfling, Elf, or Gnome. By selecting "Random" one could also choose from ogre, troll, pixie, gnoll, orc, lizard man, minotaur, and other races.

The game was notable for taking advantage of a broad mix of styles for the game: a town window which allowed purchasing in various shops, a top-down style dungeon crawl view, a top-down world map, and a separate combat window. Each character class had unique fighting styles and options and all characters could choose their strategy for a particular round in the turn-based combat segments. After a combat, experience was awarded, but the players would have to return to town to purchase their levels if they qualified.

Reception
With more than 50,000 copies sold in North America, Phantasie was very successful for SSI. It was the company's best-selling Commodore game as of late 1987. Game reviewers Hartley and Pattie Lesser in 1987 complimented the Atari ST version of Phantasie in their "The Role of Computers" column in Dragon #120 (1987), recommending that Atari ST owners should "consider Phantasie as a game well-worth their attention." ANALOG Computing in 1988 called Phantasie and its sequel the best fantasy role-playing games for the Atari 8-bit. In 1991 and 1993 Computer Gaming Worlds Scorpia called Phantasie "a surprisingly good little game, with many interesting features".

Reviews
 Casus Belli #30 (Jan 1986)

Legacy
Phantasie I, Phantasie III, and Questron II were later re-released together, and reviewed in 1994 in Dragon #203 by Sandy Petersen in the "Eye of the Monitor" column. Petersen gave the compilation 2 out of 5 stars.

References

External links
Review in ANALOG Computing
Review in ANALOG Computing
Review in Family Computing
Review in Compute!'s Gazette
Review in Info

1985 video games
Amiga games
Apple II games
Atari 8-bit family games
Atari ST games
Commodore 64 games
DOS games
FM-7 games
MSX2 games
NEC PC-9801 games
Role-playing video games
Sharp X1 games
Single-player video games
Strategic Simulations games
Video games developed in the United States